The 1914 Wabash Athletic Association football team was an American semi-pro football team that represented the Wabash Athletic Association in the 1914 college football season. The team had an 8–2–1 record and outscored its opponents by a total of 363 to 36, including a 103-point win against the Elkhart Athletic Club.  The loss against the Northwestern North Ends on October 25 was reported as the first loss at the W. A. A's home field in eight years.

Schedule

References

Wabash Athletic Association
Wabash Athletic Association Football
Wabash Athletic Association football seasons